Rudi Prisăcaru (born 3 January 1970) is a Romanian handball coach and former player. He competed in the men's tournament at the 1992 Summer Olympics.

Honours
Club
Fenix Toulouse
Coupe de France
Winner: 1998
Finalist: 1999

References

1970 births
Living people
Romanian male handball players
CS Dinamo București (men's handball) players
Romanian expatriate sportspeople in France
Olympic handball players of Romania
Handball players at the 1992 Summer Olympics
Expatriate handball players
Romanian handball coaches
People from Iași County